Vogue Singapore is the Singaporean edition of the fashion and lifestyle magazine Vogue. The magazine is published by Indochine Media. It became the 27th international edition of Vogue.

History

1994–1997: Condé Nast publishing 
In March 1994, it was announced that Condé Nast was planning to launch the first Asian edition of Vogue magazine in Singapore in September. It was said that the magazine has already set up an administrative office in the country and will bring an editorial staff in next year. Until then, the magazine will be edited and designed by Vogue Australia's office in Sydney. Vogue Singapore is expected to have an initial circulation of between 15,000 and 18,000 copies. The magazine will be priced at $3.70. About the launch, Vogue Australia's editor Nancy Pilcher said that is "probably one of the best places in the Asia Pacific to do business in," adding "[that] Besides, Singapore is like a haven of fashion. Every single label in the world is here."

The magazine officially launched in August 1994 with the September issue. The theme of the first issue is East meets West with actress Joan Chen gracing its cover. Vogue Singapore will have an initial print run of 35,000 copies for distribution in Singapore, plus 10,000 for Malaysia and 1,000 each for Brunei, Indonesia, the Philippines and Thailand. It will sell for about $3.30 a copy.

In 1996, The Wall Street Journal reported that Condé Nast Asia-Pacific would be “suspending publication of its Vogue Singapore edition because of the slowing economy in the city-state.” Then-president of Condé Nast Asia-Pacific, Didier Guerin, expressed, “The magazine was no longer economically viable in such a small market unless we compromised the quality of the magazine.” Also reporting that the magazine advertisers were withdrawing and print sales were dropping. The January 1997 was the last issue and went on sale on 30 December 1996.

2020–present: Relaunch 
In January 2020, Condé Nast announced the launch of Vogue Singapore to launch later this year with an English-language print issue, a website and presences on all relevant social platforms. It will be published under license agreement with Indochine Media Ventures, a Singapore-based media company that publishes regional editions of Robb Report and the Singapore edition of Esquire, among other titles. A print issue of Vogue Singapore will retail for around nine Singaporean Dollars. The web site will not be behind a paywall at launch, but speaking to WWD, Michael von Schlippe, president of Indochine Media, said he couldn't exclude including one down the road.

In April, Norman Tan was appointed as Editor-in-chief. He joins Vogue Singapore from Esquire Singapore, where he held the role of Editor-in-Chief for over two years. He successfully launched Buro Singapore in 2015, now bringing with him a wealth of knowledge and experience in both luxury print and digital publishing. Tan graduated from The University of Melbourne with a double degree in commerce and law.

The magazine officially launched in September 2020 with three different covers. Singaporean model Diya Prabhakar features on the main cover, while Chinese model Ju Xiaowen and Japanese actress Nana Komatsu round out the triptych. Both print and digital versions of the publication will feature scannable QR codes, as well as AR and VR content.

Editors 

|2023-present
| desmond lim
|2023
| present
|-

See also
 List of Vogue Singapore cover models

References

Vogue (magazine)
1994 establishments in Singapore
Magazines established in 1994
Magazines published in Singapore
Magazines established in 2020
Magazines disestablished in 1997
Condé Nast magazines